SGM, or sgm, may refer to:

Science 
 Second Generation Multiplex DNA profiling system - also see SGM+
 Scanning gate microscopy
 Spherical Grating Monochromator beamline of Canadian Light Source
 Semi-global matching algorithm in stereo imaging
 16S rRNA (guanine1405-N7)-methyltransferase, an enzyme
 Sexual and Gender Minorities, see sexual minority

Organisations 
 Scripture Gift Mission, London, UK
 Servicio Geológico Mexicano, the Mexican Geological Survey
 Sims Group Limited S&P/ASX 200 code
 Sociedad Geológica Mexicana, the Mexican Geological Society
 Sociedade Gestora de Fundos de Pensões Mundial, S.A., a subsidiary of Banco Internacional do Funchal
 Sovereign Grace Ministries, later Sovereign Grace Churches
 Swiss Meteorological Society (Schweizerische Gesellschaft für Meteorologie)

Places 
 Singkawang Grand Mall, Indonesia
 1 SGM, a "census town" in India
 South Glamorgan, preserved county in Wales, Chapman code

Transport 
 Schweizer SGM 1-19, a motorized glider
 Schweizer SGM 2-37, a motorized glider
 SGM, the National Rail code for St Germans railway station, Cornwall, UK
 SGM, the IATA code for San Ignacio Airfield, Baja California Sur, Mexico
 Stadsgewestelijk Materieel, a Dutch train

Other uses 
 Improved Soviet SG-43 Goryunov machine gun
 Science Guard Members, in the Japanese Mirrorman (TV series)
 Sea Gallantry Medal, UK
 Sergeant Major, US military rank
 SGM, another name for the GSM blend of Australian wine
 sgm, the ISO 639-3 code for the extinct Singa language, 
 Sleepytime Gorilla Museum, a band in Oakland, CA, US
 Standard Gross Margin of a farm

See also